Occoquan Historic District is a national historic district located at Occoquan, Prince William County, Virginia. It encompasses 60 contributing buildings in the town of Occoquan. The buildings are predominantly frame, two-story,
residential structures although the earliest examples are constructed of stone or brick. The Ellicott's Mill House (c. 1760) houses Historic Occoquan, Inc. The district also includes several notable non-residential buildings including the Hammill Hotel (c. 1830), Ebenezer Church (1853), Methodist Church (1926), and Crescent Lodge #3 (1889). Located in the district is the separately listed Rockledge.

It was added to the National Register of Historic Places in 1983.

Gallery

References

External links

Merchant's Grist Mill & Mill House (Ruins), Mill Street, Occoquan, Prince William County, VA: 1 photo and 2 data pages at Historic American Buildings Survey

Historic American Buildings Survey in Virginia
Federal architecture in Virginia
Colonial Revival architecture in Virginia
National Register of Historic Places in Prince William County, Virginia
Historic districts on the National Register of Historic Places in Virginia